Bothropoma decoratum is a species of sea snail, a marine gastropod mollusk in the family Colloniidae.

Description

Distribution
This marine species occurs off Western Australia.

References

Colloniidae
Gastropods described in 1930